Louis Piazzoli, PIME (12 May 1845 – 26 December 1904) was the Apostolic Vicar of Hong Kong from January 11, 1895 to 1904.

Biography
Born in Bergamo, Italy, Piazzoli was ordained as a priest on 1 September 1868.

Piazzoli arrived in Hong Kong in 1869. He was one of the first missionaries to reach Tai Po. In 1870, he left the mission station in Ting Kok and started his missionary work in Sham Chung, helping the farmers build a dam.

Appointed Vicar Apostolic of Hong Kong on 11 January 1895 and ordained Bishop on 19 May 1895. He died in Hong Kong.

Piazoli's remains were return to Italy, but return to Hong Kong in 2014 to rest at the crypt at Cathedral of the Immaculate Conception.

See also

 Pontifical Institute for Foreign Missions

References

 Bishop Louis Piazzoli, M.E.M.

Further reading
 Henri Daniel-Rops (1960/1965), The Church in an Age of Revolution, 1789—1870, trans., John Warington, New York:  Dutton.

Apostolic Vicars of Hong Kong
19th-century Italian Roman Catholic bishops
20th-century Italian Roman Catholic bishops
1845 births
1904 deaths